Evangelization of indigenous population to Christianity began in the 19th century under the British era. In the 1830s, American Baptist Foreign Missionary Society had become active in Northeast to evangelize indigenous tribes to Christianity. Later, they were offered to expand and reach into Sohra Meghalaya, but they lacked the resources to do so and declined. Welsh Presbyterian Mission took the offer and they began work at Sohra mission field. By the early 1900s, other Protestant denominations of Christianity were active in Meghalaya. The outbreak of World Wars forced the preachers to return home to Europe and America. It is during this period that Catholicism took root in Meghalaya and neighbouring region. Currently, Catholics, Presbyterians and Baptists are three most common Christian denominations found in Meghalaya.

Before Christianity arrived in Meghalaya a majority of tribal peoples were following Animist religion with Ka Niam Khasi and Songsarek traditions. Meghalaya is a Christian tribal state. The Christian population in Meghalaya is estimated at approximately 2.21 million which forms (74.59%) of the state population (2011 census). Meghalaya is one of three states in India to have a Christian majority. About 75% of the population practices Christianity, with Presbyterians, Baptists and Catholics the more common denominations. The religion of the people in Meghalaya is closely related to their ethnicity. Close to 90% of the Garo tribe and nearly 80% of the Khasi are Christian, while more than 97% of the Hajong, 98.53% of the Koch, and 94.60% of the Rabha tribes are Hindu.

The Roman Catholic Church with a homogeneous presence spread throughout the state of Meghalaya form the largest denomination in the state with 945,145 adherents (2020 data). The Church is under the ecclesiastical province of Shillong with the following dioceses:
1) Metropolitan Archdiocese of Shillong (342,169 adherents), 
2) Suffragan Diocese of Tura (326,716 adherents), 
3) Suffragan Diocese of Nongstoin (164,334 adherents),  and  
4) Suffragan Diocese of Jowai (111,930 adherents).

The Presbyterian Church is another largest denomination in Meghalaya under the Khasi Jaintia Presbyterian Assembly with 750,989 believers in 2015. In 2018 the Church has the following number of believers under the following synod's namely Khasi Jaintia Synod Mihngi (294,320 believers), the Khasi Jaintia Synod Sepngi (370,764 believers) and the Ri Bhoi Synod (70,510 believers) adding up to 735,594 believers with slight decline from 2015. Unlike the Catholic Church, there is little or no presence of Presbyterianism among the Garos with the absence of a Garo synod.

The Baptist Church under the Garo Baptist Convention make up perhaps the largest denomination among the Garos in Meghalaya with 500,560 adherents (both baptised and unbaptised) concentrated mostly in the Garo Hills out of a garo population of 821,026 with the remaining mostly Catholics. 
 
The Church of God in Meghalaya, an indigenous church, established in Mylliem in 1902 is the fourth largest denomination in the state with nearly 100,000 adherents.

The Church of North India  of the Anglican Communion under the Diocese of North East India in Meghalaya is the fifth largest denomination with close to 50,000 adherents. And some Christian Revival Church also growing.

Statistics

Christian percentage was 6.16% in 1901 (before India's independence), and after independence during the first census of 1951, it was found that 24.66% of the Meghalaya population follows Christianity. During 1991, Christian percentage was 64.58% and in recent 2011 census, it was found that 74.59% adheres to Christian faith.

Trends
Percentage of Christians in Meghalaya by decades

Tribes
Percentage of Christians in the Scheduled Tribes

Meghalaya Scheduled Tribe Population is 25,55,861 (86% of the state population mainly Garos and Khasis), out of which  21,57,887 people among them follow Christianity.

Whereas, Non ST population is 4,11,028 (mainly Bengalis, Nepalis, Biharis, Marwaris etc), out of which 55,140 people among them follow Christianity. As per as social activitists, Many Nepalis and Bengalis (who constitute a huge chunk of non-tribal population in the state) are being converted into Christianity by the Christian missionaries specially in Shillong and in other rural border areas of the state.

See also
 List of Christian denominations in North East India
Christian Revival Church

References

 
Meghalaya
Religion in Meghalaya